The A5 class was a type of patrol/customs vessels of the Hellenic Navy, two of which were built at the Lavrion Shipyards in 1930, based on Italian designs. They were armed with a 76 mm gun, a machine gun, as well as depth charges. Both were destroyed during WWII (1941), the first bombed by RAF after it had been seized by the Germans.

References

 
Ships built in Greece
Ships of the Hellenic Navy
1930 ships